[[File:Keep On Truckin' 1968.jpg|300px|thumb|right|Original 1968 Keep On Truckin cartoon, as published in Zap Comix.]]Keep On Truckin&apos;'' is a one-page cartoon by Robert Crumb, published in the first issue of Zap Comix in 1968. A visual burlesque of the lyrics of the Blind Boy Fuller song "Truckin' My Blues Away", it consists of an assortment of men, drawn in Crumb's distinctive style, strutting across various landscapes. The cartoon's images were imitated and much displayed during the hippie era.

Copyright and licensing issues
The image has been imitated often without permission, appearing on T-shirts, posters, belt buckles, mudflaps, and other items. During the early 1970s, Crumb's lawyer started threatening lawsuits against anyone using the image without permission. Crumb and A.A. Sales, a producer of unlicensed Keep On Truckin&apos; merchandise, reached a settlement of $750 for the past usage, but A.A. Sales continued to sell unlicensed products after the settlement without paying additional fees. In 1973, Crumb's case was accepted by U.S. Federal Court, and was heard by Judge Albert Charles Wollenberg, who had previously ruled against use of Walt Disney's characters in cartoon parodies by the cartoonists for the Air Pirates cartoons. A.A. Sales claimed the work was in the public domain, because Crumb had not included the copyright symbol on the work, although he had done so in Zap #1 as a whole. The work was protected by the terms of the 1909 Copyright Act, and any omission of notice was considered to cause the work to be public domain. The drawing had also appeared on the business card of Crumb's publisher without the copyright symbol. Based on that, Wollenberg granted A.A. Sales' request for summary judgment, and Keep On Truckin''' became public domain. In 1977, the U.S. Court of Appeals reversed that decision, and it returned to copyrighted status.

Crumb was offered $100,000 by Toyota to reproduce the image for a Keep On Truckin&apos; advertising campaign, but refused it.

Crumb has sued various entities to defend the copyright, including Amazon.com in 2005.

Crumb's notions
Crumb used the cartoon as an example of what caused the discomfort he claims he felt with his sudden fame during the late 1960s, saying:

In 1972, Crumb published a one-page self-parody of Keep On Truckin, which introduced a variety of new poses and slogans, including "Keep On Rollin' Along", "Keep On Chunkin, "Keep On Toodlin, and so on. The strip was covered in copyright symbols, and ended with an ironic suggestion that readers buy "Keep On Shuckin merchandise.

References

Comics by Robert Crumb
Short comics
Humor comics
1968 comics debuts
1968 comics endings
English words and phrases
Walking art
Comedy catchphrases
Quotations from comics
1968 neologisms